Mat Gardner (born 24 August 1985) is a professional rugby league footballer.

Rugby League Career

Huddersfield Giants
Gardner joined from Castleford Tigers (Heritage № 818) and made his Super League début in a match against Wakefield Trinity on 4 March 2006 for Huddersfield. He enjoyed a solid début season with the Huddersfield in 2006, which included a memorable hat-trick against the Catalans Dragons, and also played several games, which saw him line-up against his brother Ade Gardner.

He played in Huddersfield's first seven games and scored 2 tries, although a long run in the reserves followed before he was recalled for the game against Harlequins RL.

Salford Red Devils
With Huddersfield signing David Hodgson from Salford and Rod Jensen being established on the other wing Mat Gardner left Huddersfield and signed for Salford for the 2008 season.

Harlequins RL
Gardner moved to Harlequins RL for the 2009 Super League season. He then moved to Widnes, boarding and playing darts but never marking at The Sporties in St. Helens.

Leigh Centurions
He signed for Leigh for the 2012 season scoring 26 tries in 58 appearances up til the beginning of the 2014 season.

International
On 22 Feb 2020 Mat captained and coached Brazil in their 30-14 win over Peru in Sydney.

Rugby Union
He switched codes to represent Brazil in rugby union sevens at the Rio 2016 Olympic Games.

References 
https://www.skysports.com/rugby-league/news/12196/12034553/listen-brazil-womens-coach-and-ex-super-league-player-mat-gardner-on-the-golden-point-podcast

1985 births
Living people
Barrow Raiders players
Brazil national rugby league team coaches
Brazil national rugby league team players
Castleford Tigers players
English people of Brazilian descent
English rugby league players
Huddersfield Giants players
Leigh Leopards players
London Broncos players
Rugby league centres
Rugby league players from Barrow-in-Furness
Rugby league wingers
Salford Red Devils players
Swinton Lions players
Widnes Vikings players